The 1958 Auburn Tigers football team represented Auburn University in the 1958 NCAA University Division football season. It was the Tigers' 67th overall and 26th season as a member of the Southeastern Conference (SEC). The team was led by head coach Ralph "Shug" Jordan, in his eighth year, and played their home games at Cliff Hare Stadium in Auburn and Legion Field in Birmingham, Alabama. They finished with a record of nine wins, zero losses and one tie (9–0–1 overall, 6–0–1 in the SEC) and were selected national champions by the Montgomery Full Season Championship.

Schedule

References

Auburn
Auburn Tigers football seasons
College football undefeated seasons
Auburn Tigers football